Transcription factor EB is a protein that in humans is encoded by the TFEB gene.

Function 

TFEB is a master gene for lysosomal biogenesis. It encodes a transcription factor that coordinates expression of lysosomal hydrolases, membrane proteins and genes involved in autophagy. Upon nutrient depletion and under aberrant lysosomal storage conditions such as in lysosomal storage diseases, TFEB translocates from the cytoplasm to the nucleus, resulting in the activation of its target genes. TFEB overexpression in cultured cells induces lysosomal biogenesis, exocytosis and autophagy.  

In bacterial infection nicotinic acid adenine dinucleotide phosphate (NAADP) induction of lysosomal Ca2+ efflux and TFEB activation leads to enhanced expression of inflammatory cytokines. Viral-mediated TFEB overexpression in cellular and mouse models of lysosomal storage disorders and in common neurodegenerative diseases such as Huntington,  Parkinson and Alzheimer diseases, resulted in intracellular clearance of accumulating molecules and rescue of disease phenotypes. TFEB is activated by PGC1-alpha and promotes reduction of htt aggregation and neurotoxicity in a mouse model of Huntington disease.
TFEB overexpression has been found in patients with renal cell carcinoma and pancreatic cancer and was shown to promote tumorogenesis via induction of various oncogenic signals.

TFEB constitutive activation, due to FLCN mutations, drives renal cystogenesis and tumorigenesis in Birt–Hogg–Dubé syndrome.

Nuclear localization and activity of TFEB is inhibited by serine phosphorylation by mTORC1 and extracellular signal–regulated kinase 2 (ERK2). 
mTORC1 phosphorylation of TFEB occurs at the lysosomal surface, both of which are localized there by interaction with the Rag GTPases. Phosphorylated TFEB is then retained in the cytosol by interaction with 14-3-3 proteins. These kinases are tuned to the levels of extracellular nutrients suggesting a coordination in regulation of autophagy and lysosomal biogenesis and partnership of two distinct cellular organelles. Nutrient depletion induces TFEB dephosphorylation and subsequent nuclear translocation via the phosphatase calcineurin. 
TFEB nuclear export is mediated by CRM1 and is dependent on phosphorylation. 
TFEB is also a target of the protein kinase AKT/PKB. AKT/PKB phosphorylates TFEB at serine 467 and inhibits TFEB nuclear translocation. Pharmacological inhibition of AKT/PKB activates TFEB, promotes lysosome biogenesis and autophagy, and ameliorates neuropathology in mouse models of Juvenile Batten disease and Sanfilippo syndrome type B.
TFEB is activated in Trex1-deficient cells via inhibition of mTORC1 activity, resulting in an expanded lysosomal compartment.

References

Further reading